Le Mesnil-sur-Oger (literally Le Mesnil on Oger) is a commune in the Marne department in the Grand Est region in north-eastern France.

Champagne
The village's vineyards are located in the Côte des Blancs subregion of Champagne, and are classified as Grand Cru (100%) in the Champagne vineyard classification. On wine labels its name is often shortened to Le Mesnil. A Clos-type vineyard in the village is the source of Krug's Clos du Mesnil.

See also
Communes of the Marne department
Classification of Champagne vineyards

References

Mesnilsuroger
Grand Cru Champagne villages